The Great Seungri was a concert tour by South Korean singer Seungri. The tour began in Seoul, South Korea at the Jangchung Gymnasium on August 4, 2018, and concluded in Queenstown, Singapore at The Star Theater.

Background and development
In May 2018, YGEX announced that Seungri (V.I) will kick off his first tour in Japan with six shows in three cities, Chiba, Fukuoka and Osaka set to commence in August. In August, it was announced that tour sold 78,000 tickets in Japan from three cities. An additional shows were announced due to high demand, selling out entire 1st leg of Japan tour, including 30,000 ticket from Chiba and 16,000 from Fukuoka, total 98,000 people attend from 3 cities.

In June, the dates for South Korea shows were announced, marking it as his first shows since debuting 12 years ago. The concert series was announced as The Great Seungri and will begin at the Jangchung Gymnasium in Seoul on August 4 and 5. 8,800 tickets were sold-out on the first two shows in Seoul, and due to tickets demands, the tour was expanded in South Korea, to include Daegu and Busan.

On December, a new shows were announced in South Korea, Hong Kong and Japan, under the name "The Great Seungri Tour 2019 ~The Great Show~ an encore of the tour.

On February 28, 2019, YG Entertainment announced the cancellation of the rest of 'The Great Seungri' tour that was supposed to be held in Osaka and Jakarta. This decision comes after Seungri's recent scandal, known as the Burning Sun scandal, which he accused of drugs, corruptions, and offering prostitutes as entertainment in his business ventures. YG also announced that Seungri would be taking a hiatus with halting all the upcoming promotions.

Set list

 "Strong Baby"
 "Let's Talk About Love"
 "GG BE"
 "Gotta Talk 2 U"
 "What Can I Do"
 "Yoo Hoo!"
 "Good Luck to You"
 "Alone"
 "If You"
 "Mollado"
 "Haru Haru"
 "Love Is You"
 "I Know"
 "Come To My"
 "Love Box"
 "Last Farewell"
 "Where R U From"
 "Hotline"
 "We Like 2 Party"
 "My Heaven"
 "Hands Up"
 "Lies"
 "1, 2, 3"
 "Be Friend"
Encore
 "Bang Bang Bang"
 "Fantastic Baby"
 "In My World"

Tour dates

Canceled shows

Notes

References

External links
Official Site
YG Entertainment
Big Bang Japan Official Site

2018 concert tours
2019 concert tours
Seungri